Lesbian, gay, bisexual and transgender (LGBT) persons in the United Arab Emirates (UAE) face legal challenges not experienced by other residents. Homosexuality is illegal in the UAE. Under UAE law, consensual same-sex sexual activity is punishable by imprisonment. , there are no known arrests or prosecutions for same-sex sexual activity in the UAE since at least 2015. Individuals have been prosecuted for related offences, under public decency laws, for acts such as kissing in public, or for cross-dressing.

Additionally, non-marital or extramarital sexual activity, including heterosexual acts, may be subject to criminal prosecution as adultery or fornication (since 2022, only at the behest of a spouse or guardian). Such provisions could potentially be applied to same-sex relations.

Legality of same-sex sexual activity

The UAE's Federal Penal Code does not replace the legal system of each emirate, unless it is contrary to the federal law. Persons may be charged under the Federal Penal Code, or under a local (emirate) penal code.

The law against "voluntary debasement", variously rendered in English as 'indecent assault', 'indecency', or 'carnal knowledge' is used against consensual same-sex (and other consensual non- or extramarital) activities. This provision, Article 356, imposes penalties of terms of imprisonment of at least one year and up to fifteen years. Articles 358–359 "Flagrant indecent acts" cover sexual harassment and public indecency, such as displays of physical intimacy. Penalties range from fines to prison sentences of at least two years. Prison sentences, fines, and deportations of foreign nationals, have been consequences of such suspected or established same-sex sexual conduct. Involuntary medical and psychological "treatments", including administration of hormonal therapies, and detention for forced psychological treatments, have occurred. There have been reports of mistreatment in detention such as beatings, and forced rectal examinations, amounting to torture.

Another article of the Federal Penal Code, Article 354, states: 		
 and appears to be mainly interpreted as relating to cases of sexual violence. The International Lesbian, Gay, Bisexual, Trans and Intersex Association (ILGA) report that there are differing opinions on the effect of this provision, saying:

Neither Amnesty International nor ILGA consider this provision applicable to consensual same-sex sexual activity , while Amnesty categorically "considers this article [of law] to address rape, not consensual same-sex sexual relations." Nevertheless, as ILGA comment, the UAE:

Abu Dhabi
Article 80 of the Abu Dhabi Penal Code makes sodomy punishable by imprisonment of up to 14 years. Cross-dressing is also likewise illegal.

Enforcement cases
In 2005, 26 young men were arrested when Abu Dhabi Police raided a social gathering at a hotel in a desert resort town. The police alleged the men were found engaging in cross-dressing and preparing to celebrate a "gay wedding". In discussing the raid, Mohammed bin Nukhaira Al Dhahiri, Minister of Justice, Islamic Affairs and Auqaf stated, "There will be no room for homosexual and queer acts in the UAE. Our society does not accept queer behaviour, either in word or in action". Initial reports suggested that some of the men were ordered to accept hormone "treatments" in exchange for lighter sentences, although the Government subsequently backed off from these statements. Twelve of the men were found guilty and sentenced; eleven were given a five-year prison sentence, and one a one-year sentence. The eleven had reportedly confessed to "homosexual practices". The remaining fourteen were released after being found not guilty.

On 9 August 2017, Emirati police in Abu Dhabi detained two Singaporean nationals in a shopping mall. A court convicted them of crimes and sentenced them to one year in prison "for attempting to resemble women". The UAE deported them on 28 August after they spent nearly three weeks in custody, much of that time in a cell they said was designated for "effeminate" people.

Dubai

Article 177 of the Penal Code of Dubai imposes imprisonment of up to 10 years for consensual sodomy. The most common depictions in the local media of LGBT people involve foreigners, disease, and sex crimes such as rape.

Incidents and enforcement
In July 2007, a case involved the kidnapping and rape of a sixteen-year-old French Swiss boy by a group of men. The boy stated in a closed court session that soon after leaving the arcade, he saw a 17-year-old acquaintance who offered to drive him home and after him entering the SUV and driving past his home, the three men soon after raped the boy. Initially, the police treated the victim as a suspect and the fear of being charged under Article 177 prompted the boy and his family to leave the country. The mother accused the United Arab Emirates authorities of not notifying the family of the victim that one of the rapists was HIV-positive, testing positive 2003, thus delaying the seeking of medical attention for her son. The Dubai Police Chief brushed aside this accusation stating "The case is a court case... I think she is blaming everyone... Eventually, no formal charges were brought against the teenager who returned to testify against his rapists. The story generated international media attention with government representatives defending the criminal laws against homosexuality, saying: "This is a conservative society. Homosexuality, conducted homosexuality is an illegal act. And we are not ashamed of that." The boy's mother had launched an international campaign to boycott Dubai for the treatment of her son, but ended the campaign when the Government agreed to certain demands. The boy was also awarded AED15 million (US$4 million) in civil compensation.

In 2008, two lesbian tourists were given a one-month jail sentence and then deported for engaging in public displays of affection while visiting a beach. The trial, reportedly the first of its kind, prompted the police to create a special task force to combat homosexuality and other "indecent acts" from taking place on the beaches.

The legal and social sanctions against LGBT people mean that no formal LGBT organizations or nightclubs exist in Dubai. One nightclub called the Diamond Club sponsored a special night for the LGBT community, featuring a British cross-dressing DJ, only to be shut down by the Government.

In 2011, two men were caught having sex in a car and were sentenced to a year each in prison. One man was Pakistani, 24, while the other was Filipino, 33, both found guilty of "homosexuality", which occurred in the International City area of Dubai. Both men were deported following their prison terms.

In 2012, police arrested two Indian men for having consensual sex in a public toilet at a bus station. Both were jailed for six months each and were deported following their prison terms. In the same year, a 28-year-old British man who drunkenly had sex with another man in public were both sentenced to three years in jail followed by deportation. On 21 March 2012, police raided and broke up a gay party consisting of 30 men. On 7 June 2012, a Belgian man admitted to police that he was in a homosexual relationship with a Filipino. He was arrested and jailed for a year to be followed by deportation.
		
In December 2013, Karen Mke and Kamilla Satto, two transgender women from Brazil, were arrested at a hotel nightclub in Dubai for "imitating women" after calling the police due to prejudices they witnessed in the nightclub. After the law enforcement arrived to the nightclub and learned the two were transgender, they were arrested and the two were detained for two days without explanation. The women were not allowed to leave Dubai once their passports were taken, and faced criminal charges. The two were held in Dubai until their sentencing in March 2014 and were fined by the courts Dh 10,000 ($2722.50) and ordered to be deported.
Canadian YouTuber and model Gigi Gorgeous, who is a transgender woman, was detained for five hours by officials at Dubai International Airport on 9 August 2016 due to authorities not recognizing her gender as legitimate. Her passport was confiscated during her detention. After being released from detention, she departed immediately for Sweden.

In October 2017, a Scottish man from Stirling faced a three-year jail sentence after putting his hand on a man in a bar so as to not "bump and spill drinks". The tourist was arrested for public indecency after touching the other man's hip. The charges of public indecency were eventually dropped following the intervention of the ruler of the Emirate Mohammed bin Rashid Al Maktoum.

Gender identity and expression
Sex reassignment surgery is severely restricted to limited circumstances which are highly regulated by the state.

Since November 2020, crossdressing is illegal only for men who enter places designated for women while "disguised as a woman". Such actions are punishable by a prison sentence of up to a year and a fine of AED 100,000. Before the legal change, the penal code criminalized the wearing of clothes deemed "inapproriate for one's sex" in any circumstances.

Gay conversion practices are not prohibited or discouraged by any law or regulation.

Living conditions
In May 2015, PlanetRomeo, an LGBT social network, published its first Gay Happiness Index (GHI). Gay men from over 120 countries were asked about how they feel about society's view on homosexuality, how they are treated by other people and how satisfied they are with their lives. The UAE was ranked 85th with a GHI score of 37.

No LGBTQI+ support or advocacy organizations operate openly in the country. Social attitudes towards homosexuality and varied gender expression, together with the likelihood of state repression, prevents the establishment of such organisations or community education on related issues.

Antidiscrimination
There are no protections under any UAE law or policy against discrimination on the basis of sexual orientation, gender identity or expression, or sex characteristics.

Censorship

The Government in the United Arab Emirates has restricted access to various websites and monitors chat rooms, instant messages and blogs. There were only a few reports of prosecutions and punishments but many people on the internet have been censored their conversations and identity in gay chat rooms. The country's only internet service provider has a proxy server which blocks any website that goes against the country's moral values. Sites regarding dating or marriage, LGBT issues, the Bahá’í Faith or sites related to unblocking the censorship are all inaccessible. Some reports or sites related to unblocking the censorship are all inaccessible. Reports even suggest that any site with the word gay or sex is blocked.

The UAE's Media Regulatory Office banned the screening of Pixar's Lightyear in cinemas in June 2022, stating that the movie violated the Emirates' media content standards. The movie was opposed for depicting a same-sex relationship. Later that month, Majid, a popular Arabic-language comic book series for children, came under investigation by the UAE authorities for allegedly promoting homosexuality. The magazine withdrew its May 2022 edition, which depicted a multi-colored character. In one dialogue the character said, "Amazing, I have the capability to colour things... Ali will wish to become like me." According to The New Arab, a number of social media users had complained that Majid had intentionally used the Arabic word  in this character's speech, a word which means both a "homosexual" and "like me".

Public opinion

Summary table

See also

 Human rights in the United Arab Emirates
 LGBT rights in the Middle East
 LGBT rights in Asia
 LGBT in Islam
 Capital punishment for homosexuality

References

Further reading
  British charity that provides: Case law, evidence of public attitudes, for NGOs that assist or advocate on LGBTI issues, and Country of Origin LGBTI Specialists
 
 
 
  
  (News item reporting abuse and mistreatment of imprisoned for alleged crime unrelated to same-sex sexual activity, whose abuse worsened when disclosures about his sexual orientation were made to prison authorities.)

External links
 UK government travel advice for the United Arab Emirates: Local laws and customs
 

 
Law of the United Arab Emirates